Peel Memorial Centre for Integrated Health and Wellness is a large ambulatory care facility located in central Brampton, Ontario, opened in 2017. Part of the William Osler Health System, it replaced the Peel Memorial Hospital, closed in 2007.

Peel Memorial Centre is funded by the Central West Local Health Integration Network (LHIN). The centre is the site of the former Peel Memorial Hospital.

On March 26, 2021, the provincial government announced plans to add an in patient wing (250 beds) to the facility and plans to upgrade the centre's status as a hospital (with emergency wing to be added later).

References

Hospital buildings completed in 2017
Hospitals in the Regional Municipality of Peel
Hospitals established in 2017
2017 establishments in Ontario